Frank Marsh (April 27, 1924 – March 10, 2001) was an American politician who served as the 29th lieutenant governor of Nebraska from 1971 to 1975. A member of the Republican Party, he also held the offices of Nebraska Secretary of State and Nebraska State Treasurer.

Biography
Frank Marsh was born in Norfolk, Nebraska on April 27, 1924. He served in the United States Army in World War II. Marsh received his bachelor's degree from University of Nebraska–Lincoln and was a contractor who also taught in the Lincoln Public School system.

Marsh's father, Frank Marsh Sr. (1881–1951), served twice as Secretary of State of Nebraska (1927–1933; 1941–1951). The younger Marsh was elected to the same office in late 1952 and served in that position for eighteen years. In November 1970, Marsh was elected Lieutenant Governor of Nebraska, taking office in 1971 and serving until 1975 under Democratic Governor J. James Exon. Afterwards, he served twice as Nebraska State Treasurer: from 1975 until his resignation in 1981 (to become state director of the U.S. Farmers Home Administration) and again from 1987 to 1991. 

Later that year, Marsh was convicted of misdemeanor charges for making personal, long-distance telephone calls with government phones. In 1990, he was defeated by Dawn E. Rockey.

He married Shirley McVicker in 1943, who served in the Nebraska Legislature. Marsh died in Lincoln on March 10, 2001. Frank Marsh had six children and nine grandchildren.

References

1924 births
2001 deaths
People from Norfolk, Nebraska
Politicians from Lincoln, Nebraska
Military personnel from Nebraska
University of Nebraska–Lincoln alumni
Lieutenant Governors of Nebraska
State treasurers of Nebraska
Secretaries of State of Nebraska
Nebraska Republicans
Nebraska politicians convicted of crimes
20th-century American politicians
United States Army personnel of World War II